Tea cup ballet is a 1935 photograph by Australian modernist photographer Olive Cotton. It is arguably Cotton's best known work.  The photograph depicts six tea cups and saucers lit so to form shadows that suggest the form of ballet dancers.

The photograph was exhibited in the London Salon of Photography in 1935, the first work of Cotton's to be shown outside Australia.

The work was featured on an Australia Post stamp in 1991 commemorating 150 years of photography.

References

External links
Tea cup ballet - Art Gallery of New South Wales

Black-and-white photographs
1935 works
1935 in art
Modern art
Australian photographs
1930s photographs